Xtreme is a 2021 Spanish action thriller and martial arts film directed by Daniel Benmayor, written by Teo García, Iván Ledesma and Genaro Rodríguez and starring Teo García, Óscar Jaenada, Sergio Peris-Mencheta and Óscar Casas.

Cast

See also 
 List of Spanish films of 2021

References

External links
 
 

Spanish-language Netflix original films
Spanish action thriller films
2021 martial arts films
2020s Spanish-language films
2020s Spanish films